The 1954 Oklahoma Sooners football team (variously "Oklahoma", "OU", or the "Sooners") represented the University of Oklahoma in the 1954 college football season, the sixtieth season of Sooner football. Led by eighth-year head coach Bud Wilkinson, they played their home games at Oklahoma Memorial Stadium in Norman, Oklahoma, and were members of the Big Seven Conference.

The Sooners went undefeated and were ranked third in both final polls, released in late November at the end of the regular season. Because of a conference "no-repeat" rule, Oklahoma did not play in a bowl game.

Schedule

Roster
 E Carl Allison, Sr. 
QB Jimmy Harris, So.
C Jerry Tubbs, So.

Rankings

Postseason

NFL Draft
The following players were drafted into the National Football League following the season.

References

Oklahoma
Oklahoma Sooners football seasons
Big Eight Conference football champion seasons
College football undefeated seasons
Oklahoma Sooners football